Tirey Lafayette Ford (December 29, 1857 – June 26, 1928) was an American lawyer and Republican politician who served as a California State Senator and the 18th Attorney-General of California. He acted as General Counsel for the United Railroads in San Francisco.

Early life
Ford was born on a farm in Monroe County, Missouri, the son of Jacob Harrison Ford and Mary Winn Abernathy. He went to the district county school from 1863 to 1873 and graduated from high school in 1876.

In 1877, at the age of 19, Ford left Missouri and took an immigrant train to Colusa County, California. For three years, he worked on his uncle (Hugh J. Glenn)'s ranch; Hugh Glenn was a Democratic candidate for Governor. Ford became a student in the law office of Colonel Park Henshaw in Chico, California. Ford was admitted to the California bar in August 1882.

In 1882, Ford moved to Oroville to practice law in partnership with Senator Albert F. Jones, under the firm name of Jones & Ford. This partnership lasted for one year when Ford moved to Downieville, California, the county seat of Sierra County, where he practiced law under the firm name of Smith & Ford. He specialized in mining law. Tirey stayed in Downieville for eight years.

Marriage and children 

On February 1, 1888, Ford married Mary Emma Byington of California. She was the sister of Lewis Francis Byington and daughter of Lewis Byington. They had three children, sons Byington Ford and Tirey L. Ford Jr., and daughter Relda.

Political life

District Attorney
In 1888, Ford was elected as District Attorney of Sierra County on the Republican ticket by the largest majority than any candidate for that office in 17 years. He re-elected in 1890 to the office without opposition, the Democrats making no nomination against him.

State Senator
Ford became Republican State Senator in 1892 and 1895 for California's 3rd State Senate district, Plumas, Sierra, and Nevada Counties. On March 23, 1893, Senator Ford introduced two bills known as the Ford's Mining Bills, Senate Bill No. 50, which would allow hydraulic mining where it can be done without material injury to the navigable rivers, and Senate Bill No. 389, which would appropriate $250,000 for building restraining dams, provided by the United States Government.

State Board of Harbor Commissioners
He was appointed attorney to the State Board of Harbor Commissioners in 1894, which office he held until elected Attorney General for the state of California in 1898. Ford solved a difficult legal dispute over ownership of an area known as Channel Street located in the San Francisco's harbor leading to the bay. A judgment gave this land for public use to the city of San Francisco.

Union League Club President
In 1898, Ford was elected president of the Union League Club in San Francisco. The Republican  club extended fellowship to distinguished guests of the city. Annual meetings were often held at the Palace Hotel in San Francisco.

California Attorney General

He served as the 18th California Attorney General 1899–1902. One of his noteworthy acts was the reversal of a decision regarding the inheritance tax on the Leland Stanford estate that converted $250,000 to public schools of San Francisco. He resigned as Attorney General in order to become General Counsel for the United Railroads (URR) of San Francisco.

State Board of Prisons
In 1905, Governor George Pardee selected Ford to be the State Prison Director. Ford wrote a book called California State Prisons: their history, development and management, published in 1910. As director, he created a special bureau for paroled prisoners.

Private life

California Miners' Association
On March 7, 1892, Ford was elected President of the California Miners' Association. He was a successful mining lawyer in Downieville that was engaged as counsel by the Miners' Association to conduct important cases. Ford went to Washington in January 1896 to expedite the passage through Congress for bills to appropriate money for the construction of works to protect the rivers and streams of California.

United Railroads
 

In August 1902, Ford was appointed general counsel for the United Railroads of San Francisco. His knowledge of railroad law as of other departments of jurisprudence was comprehensive and accurate, and he stands today as one of the foremost representatives of the legal interests of California.

As attorney for URR, he was involved in a bribery scandal in 1906, but was later found to be innocent. The bribery scandal was one of the many San Francisco graft trials, which included Mayor Eugene Schmitz and attorney Abe Ruef, who were receiving bribes.

Adolphus Frederic St. Sure joined Ford's law firm in San Francisco. During the 1906 San Francisco earthquake and fire, Ford became a member of Mayor Eugene Schmitz's Committee of Fifty.

Ford was a member of the Pacific-Union Club, Bohemian Club, Union League Club of San Francisco, Commonwealth Club of California, Press, Transportation, Merchants Institute, Amaurot, and Southern Clubs, and as a Knight Templar.

Retirement

After his retirement, Ford took up historical studies and literary pursuits. In 1926 he published a novel, Dawn and the Dons: The Romance of Monterey, with vignettes and sketches by artist Jo Mora.

Tirey was an avid golfer and won the Club Shield of the Presidio Golf Club in a tournament on January 3, 1916. His hobby for reducing everything to a system led him to keep a record of his first one thousand rounds on the links. On February 19, 1925, Ford was among the 68 charter members of the Monterey Peninsula Country Club.

Death and funeral
On June 26, 1928, Ford died in his bed due to a sudden heart attack. He was 70 years old.

A funeral service was held at Gary's Chapel on Divisadero Street at Post in San Francisco. He was interred at the family mausoleum, at the Holy Cross Cemetery in Colma, California.

Books
 Dawn and the Dons; the Romance of Monterey 
 California State Prisons, their history, development and management

Articles
 The Lamp of Experience. Its Light on the Political Situation, 1896 
 The Law and the Miner, 1896 
 A Tribute to William McKinley, 1896 
 Speech on National Issues, 1900 
 ''The City Imperishable, 1917"

References

External links
 Tirey Lafayette Ford Biography
 Join California Tirey L. Ford

1857 births
1928 deaths
Burials at Holy Cross Cemetery (Colma, California)
California Attorneys General
20th-century American politicians
People from Monroe County, Missouri
Politicians from San Francisco
Lawyers from San Francisco
District attorneys in California
People from Downieville, California
People from Colusa County, California
Republican Party California state senators
19th-century American lawyers
19th-century American politicians